Commemorative coins are coins that were issued to commemorate some particular event or issue or issued on special occasions to commemorate occasions or services of national heroes or dignitaries who have rendered special services of great significance in the annals of national history. Many coins of this category serve as collectors items only, although some countries are also issuing commemorative coins for regular circulation. Commemorative coins are not part of circulation and are kept as a separate balance. On the advise of Government of Pakistan, the State Bank of Pakistan has issued the following commemorative coins on various occasions / events.

References
http://www.sbp.org.pk
Khalid Mughal Coin Collection
http://pakistan-currency.blogspot.com/
Pakistan
Coins of Pakistan